Rogers-Bagley-Daniels-Pegues House is a historic home located at Raleigh, Wake County, North Carolina.  It was built about 1855, and is a two-story, three bay by two bay, Greek Revival-style frame dwelling with a low hipped roof and Italianate-style accents.  It has a hip roofed porch with Doric order posts and bay windows.  It was built by Sion Hart Rogers (1825-1874), a Congressman from and Attorney General of North Carolina.  It was the home of Josephus Daniels (1862-1948) from about 1894 to 1913.

It was listed on the National Register of Historic Places in 1979.

References

Houses on the National Register of Historic Places in North Carolina
Greek Revival houses in North Carolina
Italianate architecture in North Carolina
Houses completed in 1855
Houses in Raleigh, North Carolina
National Register of Historic Places in Raleigh, North Carolina
1855 establishments in North Carolina